Tricholosporum tetragonosporum is a species of fungus in the family Tricholomataceae. Found in Morocco, the species was first described as Tricholoma tetragonosporum by René Maire in 1945, and transferred into Tricholosporum in 2000.

References

External links

tetragonosporum
Fungi of Africa
Fungi described in 1945